The Women's épée event of the 2014 World Fencing Championships was held on 20 July 2014. A qualification was held on 17 July.

Medalists

Draw

Finals

Top half

Section 1

Section 2

Bottom half

Section 3

Section 4

References
 Bracket

2014 World Fencing Championships
World